The British Kendo Association was founded in 1964 as a non-profit making organisation to foster and develop the practise and spirit of Kendo, Iaido and Jōdō along traditional lines with the objectives of:

 Organising and regulating the Kendo movement on a national international basis;
 Helping to foster related martial arts;
 Promoting Kendoka students to higher dan grades;
 Representing the UK internationally. 

The BKA is the only organisation in the UK which is recognised for Kendo, Iaido and Jodo by the Zen Nihon Kendo Renmei (the foremost body in Japan for these martial arts), the International Kendo Federation and Sport England. It is also the only organisation in the UK which is empowered to award Dan grades (black belts) in Kendo, Iaido and Jodo recognised by these bodies.

References

External links
 The British Kendo Association (Official)
 All Japan Kendo Federation (Official)
 International Kendo Federation (official)

Kendo organizations
Kendo Association, British
1964 establishments in the United Kingdom
Sports organizations established in 1964